The 1973 TCU Horned Frogs football team represented Texas Christian University (TCU) in the 1973 NCAA Division I football season. The Horned Frogs finished the season 3–8 overall and 1–6 in the Southwest Conference. The team was coached by Billy Tohill, in his third and final year as head coach. The Frogs played their home games in Amon G. Carter Stadium, which is located on campus in Fort Worth, Texas.

Schedule

Personnel

Season summary

at Ohio State

References

TCU
TCU Horned Frogs football seasons
TCU Horned Frog football